This is a list of instruments by Hornbostel-Sachs number, covering those instruments that are classified under 111 under that system. These instruments are directly struck idiophones.

 Two or more complementary sounding parts are struck against each other.
Castanets
Claves
Clash Cymbals

References

 http://www.music.vt.edu/musicdictionary/texti/Idiophone.html
 https://web.archive.org/web/20110605070024/http://www.let.uu.nl/~Rudolf.Rasch/personal/Muziekinstrumenten03.PDF
 http://www.wesleyan.edu/vim/svh.html

Notes

Lists of musical instruments by Hornbostel–Sachs number
Lists of percussion instruments
Concussion idiophones